Paweł Sęk (born 7 April 1977, Przemyśl) is a Polish producer, composer and audio engineer. He received three Grammy Award nominations. He grew up in Przemyśl, Poland. In 2000, Sek graduated from Berklee College of Music in Boston. After graduating, he moved to New York, where he started writing and producing music for television shows and advertising.

Credits
His credits include, Carrier, Frontier House - PBS, Beowulf - Trailer, KFC National Campaign, GM National TV ad, Audi National TV ad. In 2009 he relocated to Los Angeles where he started to work with major label recording artists. His current engineering credits include: Jeff Bhasker, Taylor Swift, Lady Gaga, FUN., P!nk, Kanye West, Jay-Z, The Sleepy Jackson, Empire Of The Sun.

Sek's film scoring credits include: The Way, Way Back (Score Mix), Deadline, The Ballerina and the Rocking Horse. In 2012, Pawel was nominated for two Grammys in the Album of the Year and Record of the Year categories with the group FUN.

Engineering
FUN.
Some Nights
Some Nights (Intro)
Some Nights
We Are Young
Carry On
Why Am I the One
All Alone
Stars
Taylor Swift
RED
Holy Ground
The Lucky One
P!nk
The Truth About Love
Just Give Me a Reason (featuring Nate Ruess)
Dido
Girl Who Got Away
Let Us Move On (featuring Kendrick Lamar)
Jay-Z / Kanye West
Watch The Throne
Lift Off (featuring Beyoncé)

Film Scoring Credits
, 2012
, (Music Score Mix), 2013
, 2011
Carrier, 2008

Music Licensing Credits
Beowulf - movie and video game trailer
Daltry Calhoun - trailer
Scrubs
The Unusuals
Pimp My Ride
Making The Band
America's Next Top Model

References

External links

1977 births
American audio engineers
American people of Polish descent
American film score composers
American male film score composers
Living people
Musicians from New York City
People from Przemyśl
Berklee College of Music alumni
Engineers from New York (state)